Vráble is a small town in the Nitra District, Nitra Region, western Slovakia.

Etymology
The name derives from vrábeľ - a Slovak dialect name of sparrow (vrabec).

Geography
The cadastral area of the town has an altitude from  ASL. There's a small dam called Vodná nádrž Vráble west of the town.

The town has three parts: Vráble proper, and the former villages of Dyčka and Horný Ohaj (both annexed 1975).

History
The oldest evidence of the settlement of Vráble comes from the Neolithic age (6000-2000 BC). The  first written reference is from 1265 as Verebel. In Vráble, there was the oldest post-station. The city kept  an agricultural character in the 19th and 20th centuries. Economic development has influenced the architecture of the city. After break-up of Austria-Hungary in 1918, the town became part of Czechoslovakia and received status of the district capital (until 1960). After the First Vienna Award, the town was from 1938 to 1945 part of Hungary.

Demographics
The town had Hungarian majority in the 17th century according to the Turkish tax census.
According to the 2001 census, the town had 9,493 inhabitants. 93.32% of inhabitants were Slovaks, 4.69% Hungarians, 0.78% Roma and 0.55% Czechs. The religious make-up was 88.41% Roman Catholics, 8.53% people with no religious affiliation and 0.62% Lutherans.

Fidvár archaeological site
One of the largest urban agglomerations of the Bronze Age in Europe was found at Fidvár near Vráble. The area of 20 hectares makes it larger than the contemporary Mycenae and Troy. The settlement was inhabited by about 1,000 people and buildings were built around streets. Three ditches strengthened the fortifications. The site is also the northernmost known tell in Central Europe dating from the Early Bronze Age. It was an important centre for the exploitation of nearby gold and tin deposits. The settlement is attributed to the Unetice culture and subsequent Mad'arovce culture.

Twin towns — sister cities

Vráble is twinned with:
 Andouillé, France
 Csurgó, Hungary  
 Nova Varoš, Serbia

References

External links
 Official website 

Cities and towns in Slovakia
Archaeological sites in Slovakia